Mian Alamdar Abbas Qureshi (born
1 January 1963) is a Pakistani politician who had a member of the Provincial Assembly of the Punjab from August 2018 till January 2023.

Early life and education
He was born on 1 January 1963 in Muzaffargarh.

He has the degree of Master of Arts which he obtained in 1984 from Forman Christian College.

Political career

He was elected to the Provincial Assembly of the Punjab as an independent candidate from Constituency PP-255 (Muzaffargarh-V) in 2013 Pakistani general election. He joined Pakistan Muslim League (N) in May 2013.

He was re-elected to Provincial Assembly of the Punjab as an independent candidate from Constituency PP-277 (Muzaffargarh-X) in 2018 Pakistani general election.

In August 2018, he joined Pakistan Tehreek-e-Insaf (PTI).

References

Living people
Punjab MPAs 2013–2018
1963 births
Pakistan Muslim League (N) politicians
Pakistan Tehreek-e-Insaf MPAs (Punjab)
Punjab MPAs 2018–2023
Forman Christian College alumni
People from Muzaffargarh
People from Muzaffargarh District
Politicians from Muzaffargarh